Route 25 is a , primary state highway connecting the city of Bridgeport and the town of Brookfield in the U.S. state of Connecticut. Route 25 is a six-lane freeway from Bridgeport to northern Trumbull and a two-lane surface road the rest of the way to Brookfield.

Route 25 was originally laid out as a toll road known as the Bridgeport and Newtown Turnpike in 1801. The Route 25 designation was assigned in 1932 to the turnpike alignment and additionally extended through New Milford all the way to Torrington. The route was cut back to its modern northern terminus in Brookfield in 1974, with U.S. Route 202 taking over the old alignment. The Bridgeport-Newtown corridor had been planned as an expressway since the 1950s. The modern Route 25 expressway was fully open by 1982.

Route description
Route 25 begins at an interchange with Interstate 95 in Bridgeport. For the first  of the route, it is co-signed with the Route 8 freeway. After the split with Route 8, it continues as its own freeway through the town of Trumbull for another , providing partial access to the Merritt Parkway (Route 15) along its path through the town. The freeway portion ends at the junction with Route 111 on the northern edge of town.

Route 25 continues northward as a surface road following Main Street into Monroe, where it intersects with the northern end of Route 59 in the village of Stepney. Upon entering Newtown, the road becomes known as South Main Street. After turning north onto Hawleyville Road, it intersects I-84 at Exit 9. For the rest of its length, Route 25 is a secondary minor arterial road, crossing Route 133, and ending at U.S. Route 202 in Brookfield.

History
Route 25 was originally laid out as a toll road known as the Bridgeport and Newtown Turnpike in 1801 and ran from Bridgeport via Newtown borough to Brookfield Center. In 1848, the north and south ends were made free. In the south, tolls were no longer collected within the city limits of Bridgeport, and in the north, the road north of Newtown borough was made free. In 1886, Fairfield County dissolved all turnpike corporations in its jurisdiction, causing the Bridgeport and Newtown Turnpike to become a public road.

Route 25 was designated along the old turnpike route in the 1932 state highway renumbering. When originally designated in 1932, Route 25 continued well beyond Brookfield, following Route 133 and Route 67 to New Milford (via Bridgewater), then turning northeast along modern Route 202 before terminating at Route 8 in Torrington. In April 1943, a portion of Routes 25 and 133 swapped alignments. Route 25 now connected to U.S. Route 7 in Brookfield and overlapped it to New Milford, bypassing Bridgewater. In 1963, Route 25 was extended further eastward to Route 44 in Canton after the relocation of Route 4. In 1974, U.S. Route 202 was relocated and the portion of Route 25 from Brookfield to Canton was taken over by US 202. Route 25 was truncated to its present terminus in Brookfield at this time.

Expressway relocation
Before the last segment of the Route 25 Expressway opened in 1982, Route 25 originally followed Main Street through Bridgeport northward to the present-day expressway terminus. The old Route 25 through Bridgeport became an extension of Route 111 when the expressway opened.

The Route 25 expressway was originally planned to continue north to meet I-84 in Newtown, where a semi-directional interchange and freeway stub for the planned expressway connection was built.  The planned  extension was canceled in 1991, along with many other highway projects due to a fiscal crisis arising when Connecticut was especially hit hard by the Late 1980s recession.  At that time Connecticut's economy was heavily reliant on the defense industry.  The end of the Cold War combined with the recession resulted in a near-total collapse of Connecticut's industrial base, and a loss of billions of dollars in tax revenues generated by these industries.

During the late 1990s, an alternative plan to widen the existing Route 25 to 4 lanes with a center turn lane in certain spots through Trumbull, Monroe, and Newtown was met with opposition, particularly in Newtown where there was strong opposition to any type of project that will change the existing profile of the Route 25 corridor, despite the high accident rate and congestion on the road. In the early 2000s the Connecticut Department of Transportation (ConnDOT) was forced to resort to a plan that will widen and improve intersections on Route 25 from the expressway terminus in Trumbull to the Monroe/Newtown town line, but opposition in Newtown has compelled ConnDOT to limit upgrades in that community to spot improvements at major intersections and routine maintenance and periodic rehabilitation or replacement of existing bridges and culverts without adding capacity to the road. To ease traffic congestion in Newtown, ConnDOT opened the Mile Hill Road Bypass (SR 860), cutting through the former Fairfield Hills Hospital property and connecting to I-84 and Route 34 at the freeway stub originally intended for Route 25 (now part of SSR 490).  Under the belief an expressway will never be built along Route 25 or Route 34, ConnDOT plans to remove this freeway stub and the high-speed interchange, replacing it with a diamond interchange within the next 10 years.  ConnDOT is also planning to build a rest area on land left over when the interchange conversion is complete.

Current upgrades

Between Route 111 in Trumbull and Route 59 in Stepney, the two-lane undivided arterial section of Route 25, carries dense traffic loads during the day.  Most of the daily traffic backups are caused by vehicles waiting to make a left turn onto Tashua Road or Spring Hill Road in northern Trumbull.  To alleviate traffic in this area, the following amends were initiated in 2007:

 Add a right turn branch from CT-25 Southbound to CT-111 Southbound.
 Upgrade the intersections at Tashua and Spring Hill Roads (more details to follow).
 Replace signage and renumber exits from sequential to mileage-base numbering on the freeway portion between the Route 8 split and Route 111.  CONNDOT anticipates letting this contract to bid in August 2014. (This project will not affect the exit numbers on the 25/8 concurrency, which will be renumbered under a separate contract to replace signage on Route 8.)

Major intersections
CTDOT will be renumbering the exits to mile-based exit numbers as part of a sign replacement that will be taking along on the Route 25 corridor in Winter 2022.

References

External links

025
Transportation in Bridgeport, Connecticut
Danbury, Connecticut
Newtown, Connecticut
Trumbull, Connecticut
Transportation in Fairfield County, Connecticut
U.S. Route 202